Saurornitholestes ("lizard-bird thief") is a genus of dromaeosaurid theropod dinosaur from the Late Cretaceous of Canada (Alberta) and the United States of America (Montana, New Mexico, Alabama, North Carolina, and South Carolina).

Two species have been named: Saurornitholestes langstoni in 1978 and Saurornitholestes sullivani in 2015. Saurornitholestes was a small bipedal carnivorous dinosaur, equipped with a sickle-claw on the second toe of each foot.

Discovery and naming
In 1974, Canadian amateur paleontologist Irene Vanderloh discovered the skeleton of a small theropod near Steveville, Alberta. She showed it to John Storer of the Provincial Museum of Alberta, who brought it to the attention of Hans-Dieter Sues. In 1978 Sues named and described the specimen as the type species Saurornitholestes langstoni. The generic name is in reference to the Saurornithoididae, due to the resemblance with this group that is today seen as part of Troodontidae, and combines their name with the Greek word lestes, "thief". The specific name honours Wann Langston, Jr.

The holotype specimen, TMP 1974.10.5, was uncovered in a layer of the Dinosaur Park Formation dating to the late Campanian. It consists of a very fragmentary skeleton including teeth, pieces of the skull, two vertebrae, a few ribs, pieces of the tail, and a part of the hand. Three paratypes were also assigned: CMN 12343, CMN 12354, and UA 5283, all frontals.

Additional specimens

Two more complete, larger partial skeletons (RTMP 88.121.39 and MOR 660), dozens of isolated bones, and scores of teeth are known from the badlands of Dinosaur Provincial Park in Alberta; most of these are housed at the Royal Tyrrell Museum of Palaeontology, in Drumheller, Alberta and remain undescribed. The Alberta and Montana remains are usually attributed to the single species Saurornitholestes langstoni, though they come from a variety of rock formations indicating a wide span of time; for example, the Oldman Formation (dated to about 77 million years ago) and the upper Two Medicine Formation (about 72 million years ago). Similar teeth are found in younger deposits, dated to around 70 to 69 million years ago, but whether they represent S. langstoni or a different, related species is unknown. Neonate-sized Saurornitholestes fossils have been reported in scientific literature.

Fragmentary fossils of Saurornitholestes have also been found from the eastern half of the United States of America. A tooth found in the Mooreville Chalk of Alabama has been assigned to the genus. In 2015, Schwimmer et al. identified the existence of Saurornitholestes langstoni from the Tar Heel, Coachman, and Donoho Creek formations of North and South Carolina based on diagnostic teeth and a pedal ungual. This also makes S. langstoni the only dromaeosaurid taxon currently reported to have actually lived on the East Coast.

Saurornitholestes sullivani is known from the Hunter Wash fauna of the Kirtland Formation in New Mexico, based on the frontal specimen SMP VP-1270. It differs from S. langstoni in the characters of the frontal.

A well-preserved skeleton of Saurornitholestes (specimen UALVP 55700) discovered in 2014 is currently under preparation by University of Alberta paleontologists working in Japan. After examining the skull of the specimen, Currie and Evans announced in 2019 that the Zapsalis teeth from the Dinosaur Park Formation represented the second premaxillary tooth of S. langstoni.

Formerly assigned species
In 2006, Robert Sullivan named and described a second nominal species, Saurornitholestes robustus, based on holotype specimen, SMP VP-1955, a left frontal. The specific name refers to the great thickness of this bone, the only trait in which the species is known to differ from S. langstoni. The holotype was found in the Willow Wash fauna of the Kirtland Formation in New Mexico, dated to about 73 million years ago. However, a subsequent overview of dromaeosaurid phylogeny asserted that S. robustus lacked dromaeosaurid characters and should be considered an indeterminate theropod, and a study published in 2014 took the conclusion a step further by demonstrating that S. robustus was assignable to Troodontidae based on similarities with troodontids.

Possible indeterminate fossils are known from the Hell Creek Formation in Montana, North Dakota, and South Dakota, dated to about 66 million years ago.

Description

Like other theropods in the Dromaeosauridae, Saurornitholestes had a long, curving, blade-like claw on the second toe of each foot. Saurornitholestes was more long-legged and lightly built than other dromaeosaurids such as Velociraptor and Dromaeosaurus. It resembles Velociraptor in having large, fanglike teeth in the front of its jaws. Saurornitholestes most closely resembles Velociraptor, although the precise relationships of these dromaeosaurids are still relatively poorly understood.

Classification

In 1978, Sues assigned Saurornitholestes to the Dromaeosauridae. Later studies most often found it a member of the dromaeosaurid Velociraptorinae, but a cladistic analysis by Philip J. Currie in 2009 recovered a position in a more basal dromaeosaurid clade that was named the Saurornitholestinae.

The cladogram below is the result of a 2019 analysis by Philip J. Currie and David C. Evans. Currie and Evans recovered Saurornitholestes as the sister taxon of Atrociraptor.

Paleobiology

Senses
Saurornitholestes sullivani is thought to have had a keen sense of smell, due to its brain case showing that it had an unusually large olfactory bulb.

Teeth function
The second premaxillary teeth of (at least) Saurornitholestes, Velociraptor, and Bambiraptor may have been structurally specialized for preening feathers. This may also have been the function of the unusual premaxillary teeth of the oviraptorosaurs Protarchaeopteryx and Incisivosaurus.

Feeding habits 

Saurornitholestes feeding habits were discovered to be typical of coelurosaurian theropods, with a characteristic "puncture and pull" feeding method. Studies of wearing patterns on its teeth by Angelica Torices et al. in a study regarding theropod feeding habits indicate that dromaeosaurid teeth share similar wearing patterns to those seen in the tyrannosaurids and troodontids, respectively. However, micro-wearing on the teeth indicated that Saurornitholestes likely preferred larger prey items than the troodontids it shared the environment with. Such differentiations in its diet likely allowed it to inhabit the same environment as its more distant maniraptoran relatives. The same study also indicated that both Saurornitholestes and the related Dromaeosaurus (also analyzed in the study) likely included bones in their diet and were better adapted to handle the stress associated with attacking struggling prey, while troodontids, equipped with weaker jaws, preyed on softer animals and prey items, such as invertebrates and carrion. This feeding strategy and ability to handle struggling prey was also a feature that the dromaeosaurid shared with tyrannosaurids, such as Gorgosaurus, which was also analyzed in said study alongside these smaller theropods.

A tooth of Saurornitholestes has been found embedded in the wing bone of a large pterosaur, probably a juvenile Quetzalcoatlus. Because the pterosaur was so much larger than Saurornitholestes, Currie and Jacobsen suggest that the theropod was probably scavenging the remains of an already dead animal.

Paleopathology
In 2001, Bruce Rothschild and others published a study examining evidence for stress fractures and tendon avulsions in theropod dinosaurs and the implications for their behavior. They found that only two of the 82 Saurornitholestes foot bones checked for stress fractures actually had them. Two of the nine hand bones examined for stress fractures were found to have them as well.

Aase Roland Jacobsen published a description of a Saurornitholestes dentary in 2001. The dentary is about 12 cm long and preserves fifteen tooth positions, of which only ten preserve teeth. Three toothmarks were visible on the inner "lingual" surface of the dentary. Two of the three marks are series of grooves made by the serrations on the maker's teeth. The striations are between 0.37 mm and 0.40 mm thick with cuboidal cross-sections.

The shape of the preserved serrations are too different from those of Saurornitholestes for the marks to be the result of injuries incurred during intraspecific face biting behaviors. Although the right shape for Dromaeosaurus tooth serrations, the preserved marks are too coarse to have been left by that genus. Although a specific identification cannot be made, the most likely perpetrator would be a juvenile individual of one of the Dinosaur Park Formation's tyrannosaurids, like Gorgosaurus, or Daspletosaurus.

Paleoenvironment

Saurornitholestes was found on both sides of the Western Interior Seaway. Alberta, the location of Saurornitholestes langstoni, had a habitat similar to the United States Midwest, being plains and floodplain swamps. In its eastern range, Saurornitholestes lived alongside hadrosaurs like Eotrachodon and Hypsibema, large theropods like Appalachiosaurus and Dryptosaurus, an unidentified ornithomimosaur, and another unidentified small theropod that was likely either a dromaeosaurid or a troodontid. Saurornitholestes appears to have been the most common small theropod in Dinosaur Provincial Park, with teeth and bones being much more common than those of its more robust contemporary, Dromaeosaurus.

See also

 Timeline of dromaeosaurid research

Footnotes

References
 
 
 Currie P.J. & Koppelhus E.B., Dinosaur Provincial Park: a spectacular ancient ecosystem revealed, Vol. 1 (Indiana University Press, 2005), p. 372–373.
 Jacobsen, A.R. 2001. Tooth-marked small theropod bone: An extremely rare trace. p. 58-63. In: Mesozoic Vertebrate Life. Ed.s Tanke, D. H., Carpenter, K., Skrepnick, M. W. Indiana University Press.
 Longrich N.R. & Currie P.J. (2009), "A microraptorine (Dinosauria–Dromaeosauridae) from the Late Cretaceous of North America", PNAS 106(13): p. 5002-5007.
 Norell, Mark A. and Makovicky, Peter J. "Dromaeosauridae." In: Weishampel, David B.; Dodson, Peter; and Osmólska, Halszka (eds.): The Dinosauria, 2nd, Berkeley: University of California Press. Pp. 208. 
 Saurornitholestes - Dinosaur Saurornitholestes Characteristics, Behavior and Habitat; Subheadings: Habitat, Historical Period, Size and Weight
 Sullivan, R.M. (2006). "Saurornitholestes robustus, n. sp. (Theropoda:Dromaeosauridae) from the Upper Cretaceous Kirtland Formation (De-Na-Zin member_), San Juan Basin, New Mexico." NMMNH Bulletin 35: 253–256.
 Sullivan, R.M. and Lucas, S.G. (2006). "The Kirtlandian land-vertebrate "age" – faunal composition, temporal position and biostratigraphic correlation in the nonmarine Upper Cretaceous of western North America." New Mexico Museum of Natural History and Science, 35': 7-29.
 Tanke, D.H. and Brett-Surman, M.K. 2001. Evidence of Hatchling and Nestling-Size Hadrosaurs (Reptilia:Ornithischia) from Dinosaur Provincial Park (Dinosaur Park Formation: Campanian), Alberta, Canada. pp. 206–218. In: Mesozoic Vertebrate Life—New Research Inspired by the Paleontology of Philip J. Currie. Edited by D.H. Tanke and K. Carpenter. Indiana University Press: Bloomington. xviii + 577 pp.

Late Cretaceous dinosaurs of North America
Eudromaeosaurs
Fossil taxa described in 1978
Taxa named by Hans-Dieter Sues
Kirtland fauna
Oldman fauna
Dinosaur Park fauna
Paleontology in Alberta
Paleontology in New Mexico
Paleontology in Montana
Campanian genus first appearances
Maastrichtian genus extinctions